James Joseph Phelan (March 19, 1929 – June 15, 2021) was an American college basketball coach. He is best known for his 49-year coaching career at Mount Saint Mary's University. Phelan was a 1951 graduate of La Salle University and played one season for the Philadelphia Warriors of the NBA. He was famous for wearing a bow tie on the sidelines.

Early life
Born in Philadelphia, Phelan graduated from La Salle College High School in 1947 and La Salle University in 1951. From 1951 to 1953, during the Korean War, Phelan served in the United States Marine Corps.

Professional playing career
Selected in the eighth round (77th overall) in the 1951 NBA draft, Phelan played in three games as a reserve for the Philadelphia Warriors in 1953. He then played for the Pottstown Packers in the Eastern League.

Coaching career
Phelan coached his entire career at Mount Saint Mary's University. He led the Mountaineers to the 1962 NCAA Men's Division II Basketball Championship. When he retired in 2003, after coaching for 49 years, he had amassed 830 wins (overall record of 830-524) in over 1,300 games in all divisions. In those 49 years, Phelan had 19 teams that reached 20 or more wins in a season. Prior to the announcement of his induction to the National Collegiate Basketball Hall of Fame in April 2008, Phelan was often noted for having the most victories of any coach not in the Hall of Fame.

He got his 800th win in the Northeast Conference Championship Game on March 1, 1999. He became just the fourth coach in NCAA history to get 800 career wins; currently he sits 14th on the all-time list. On January 19, 1998, he became just the second coach in NCAA history to coach in 1,200 career games. The only other coach to do so prior was Clarence Gaines. Phelan held the record in games coached with 1,354 across all NCAA divisions and is currently fourth on the all-time list; he is behind Phog Allen and tied with Jim Smith for second place in total career seasons coached with 49, though all 49 of Phelan's and Smith's seasons came at one school while Allen coached at four other institutions besides Kansas, where he gained fame.

Coaching highlights
830 wins (14th most all time)
1,354 games coached (4th most all time)
5 Final Fours
16 NCAA Division II Tournament Appearances
2 NCAA Division I Tournament Appearances
2 Championship games coached
1962 NCAA Division II Champions
1962 National Coach of the Year

Players coached
Notable players that Phelan coached include Fred "Mad Dog" Carter, Jack Sullivan, and Jon O'Reilly. The 1962 team won the school's only national championship. Phelan earned his first of two coach of the year awards in '62. In the book, King of the Mount: The Jim Phelan Story, the 1980-1981 season is a highlight.

Acknowledgments
Collegeinsider.com, in 2003, renamed its coach of year award the "Jim Phelan National Coach of the Year Award".

Mount Saint Mary's University has also renamed its court "Jim Phelan Court", complete with his years coached and his signature bow tie painted on each end of the court. A new banner was also revealed in the ARCC Arena (MSMU's home court) with a Phelan bow tie and signifying his 830 wins.

The Northeast Conference Coach of the Year award is named after Jim Phelan.

In November 2008, Phelan was inducted into the National Collegiate Basketball Hall of Fame in Kansas City, MO. Other members of his induction class included Nolan Richardson (former coach at the University of Arkansas), Charles Barkley (former Auburn player and NBA veteran), and commentators Billy Packer and Dick Vitale. Phelan said of his induction, "It is an honor to be selected for induction. It's a great feeling to be in such a distinguished group of gentlemen."

Personal life
Phelan and his wife Dottie had five children (Jim, Lynne, Carol, Larry, and Bobby) and ten grandchildren. 

Phelan died on June 15, 2021 at the age of 92 at his home in Emmitsburg.

Head coaching record

See also
 List of college men's basketball coaches with 600 wins

References

External links
 

1929 births
2021 deaths
United States Marine Corps personnel of the Korean War
American men's basketball players
Basketball coaches from Pennsylvania
Basketball players from Philadelphia
College men's basketball head coaches in the United States
Guards (basketball)
La Salle Explorers men's basketball players
Mount St. Mary's Mountaineers baseball coaches
Mount St. Mary's Mountaineers men's basketball coaches
National Collegiate Basketball Hall of Fame inductees
Philadelphia Warriors draft picks
Philadelphia Warriors players
United States Marine Corps officers
Sportspeople from Philadelphia